Steingrímur Thorsteinsson (1831–1913) was an Icelandic poet and writer. He translated many works of literature into Icelandic, including Arabian Nights and the fairy tales of Hans Christian Andersen.

External links
 
Steingrímur's translation of Arabian nights
Steingrímur's translation of H.C. Andersen's tales

1831 births
1913 deaths
Steingrimur Thorsteinsson
Steingrimur Thorsteinsson